Ocypode is a genus of ghost crabs found in the sandy shores of  tropical and subtropical regions throughout the world. They have a box-like body, thick and elongated eyestalks, and one claw is larger than the other in both males and females. They inhabit deep burrows in the intertidal zone. They are primarily nocturnal, and are generalist scavengers and predators of small animals. The genus contains 21 species.

Taxonomy
The genus Ocypode was first established by the German entomologist Friedrich Weber in 1795, using the type species Cancer ceratophthalmus described by the German naturalist Peter Simon Pallas in 1772.

Ocypode was previously the only genus classified under the ghost crab subfamily Ocypodinae until 2013, when Katsushi Sakai and Michael Türkay reclassified the gulf ghost crab into a separate genus, Hoplocypode. It belongs to the family Ocypodidae. Ghost crabs of the genus Hoplocypode can be distinguished from those in Ocypode by examining their gonopods. In the former, the first gonopod has a complex hoof-shaped tip, while in the latter they are simple and curved.

Description
Ocypode ghost crabs have deep box-like bodies. The regions on the carapace are usually not clearly defined. They have thick and elongated eyestalks with the cornea occupying most of the lower portion. The eyestalks are also tipped with horn-like projections (styles) in seven species (Ocypode brevicornis, O. ceratophthalma, O. gaudichaudii, O. macrocera, O. mortoni, O. rotundata, and O. saratan). Though these may be shorter or even absent altogether in juvenile specimens. While in O. cursor the eyestalks are tipped with a tuft of bristles (setae). The eyestalks are held vertically when the crab is active.  Most species have pale-colored bodies that blend in well with the sand, though they are capable of gradually changing body coloration to match their environment and the time of day.

The claw-bearing legs (chelipeds) of both sexes are unequal in size, with one much larger than the other. The palm of the claws also possess stridulating (sound-producing) ridges which they use for communication. These ridges are also important morphological characters useful for identifying species. The chelipeds are shorter than the walking legs. The last pair of walking legs (pereiopods) is also usually shorter and thinner than the other pairs of walking legs. A cavity, with edges fringed by long setae are also found in between the bases of the second and third walking legs.

Ecology

Ocypode ghost crabs construct simple to complex deep burrows in soft sandy and/or muddy substrates. They can be found in sandy beaches, rubble flats, and in estuarine areas. They are nocturnal and are generalist scavengers and predators of small animals.

Distribution
Ocypode ghost crabs are found in tropical and subtropical regions throughout the world. Three species are found in the Atlantic Ocean and the Mediterranean Sea and one in the eastern Pacific coast of the Americas. The rest of the species are found in the western Pacific and the Indian Ocean to the tip of southern Africa.

Species
Ocypode currently contains 21 valid species. The ghost crab formerly known as O. occidentalis was transferred to its own genus Hoplocypode in 2013. O. longicornuta, O. platytarsis, O. pygoides and O. sinensis were determined to be synonyms of O. ceratophthalma, O. brevicornis, O. convexa and O. cordimanus respectively.

See also 

Heloecius - the semaphore crab

References

External links

Video of Ocypode ceratophthalma eating a moon crab in Saint John's Island, Singapore

Ocypodoidea